Events in the year 1831 in Brazil.

Incumbents
 Monarch – 
 (until April 7) Pedro I 
 (starting April 7) Pedro II

Events

May
May 2 - Emperor Pedro I abdicates from his post, leaving the throne for his 5-year-old son Pedro II. Since Pedro II was a minor, the country entered a regency period until he reached the age of 15 in 1840.

Births

Deaths

References

 
1830s in Brazil
Years of the 19th century in Brazil
Brazil
Brazil